Mihalj is a village in the Slivno municipality of the Dubrovnik-Neretva County, Croatia. According to the 2011 census, the village had 156 inhabitants.

History
It was established as Mihalj-Kremena  in 1948. In 2001, maritime Kremena and Lučina were established out of territory (former hamlets) of Mihalj.

Demographic history
According to the 1991 census, the village had 220 inhabitants, divided by ethnic identification as: Serbs (48,18%), Croats (41,81%), Yugoslavs (7,72%). In 2001, it had 212 inhabitants in 59 households.

References

Populated places in Dubrovnik-Neretva County
Serb communities in Croatia